Empty House may refer to:

The Adventure of the Empty House, Sherlock Holmes story
"Empty House", 2000 song by Air from The Virgin Suicides
"Empty House", 2019 song by Doll Skin from Love Is Dead and We Killed Her
"Empty House", 2019 song by Low Roar from Ross
"Empty House", 2020 song by Neck Deep from All Distortions Are Intentional
"Empty House", 2016 song by Relient K from Air for Free
"Empty Houses", 2007 song by Garry Schyman from BioShock